Events in the year 1938 in China.

Incumbents
President - Lin Sen
Premier - Kung Hsiang-hsi (Dr. H. H. Kung)
Vice Premier - Zhang Qun
Foreign Minister - Wang Ch'ung-hui

Events

January 
 1 January - The KMT Central Standing Committee resolved at its 62nd meeting, Chiang Kai-shek resigned, the election of Kong Xiangxi as the executive president, leaving the post of vice president of the Executive Yuan, Zhang Qun successor.
 24 January- Han Fuju was sentenced to death and executed in Wuchang at 7 pm.
January - Nanking Massacre
January–June - Battle of Northern and Eastern Henan

February 
 18 February - The Imperial Japanese Army Air Service launched air strikes against Wuhan.(Battle of Wuhan)

March
 24 March – 1 May - Battle of Xuzhou
 24 March – 7 April - Battle of Taierzhuang

April
 29 April - To celebrate Emperor Hirohito's birthday, The Imperial Japanese Army Air Service conducted a massive bombing of Wuhan. (Battle of Wuhan)

May
May - Battle of Lanfeng
 10 May – 12 May - Amoy Operation

June
 6 June - the Japanese forces capture Kaifeng, Henan
 13 June - the Japanese landing forces occupy Anqing City, Anhui Province.

October 
 1 October to 11 October - Battle of Wanjialing
October–December - Canton Operation

November
13 November - 1938 Changsha Fire

Births
 March - Fu Zhihuan
 April - He Jingtang, a prominent Chinese architect.
 July - Shu Huiguo
 28 September - Huang Ju (died 2007)
 October - Li Qiyan
 26 October - Tom Meschery, basketball player and coach
 28 December - Chen Sisi

Deaths
January 20 - Liu Xiang (warlord)
January 24 - Han Fuju
March 14 - Wang Mingzhang
September 30 - Tang Shaoyi
Shen Hongying

See also
 List of Chinese films of the 1930s

References

 
1930s in China
Years of the 20th century in China